Mr. Finchley Goes to Paris is a comedy novel  by the British writer Victor Canning. It was the second of a trilogy featuring the mild-mannered Edgar Finchley. The first publication in 1938 was by Hodder and Stoughton in the UK and Carrick and Evans in the USA. It was included in the Heinemann Uniform Edition of 1974, and a new edition has recently appeared (2019) from Farrago Books. In 1990 it was adapted for radio by the BBC starring Richard Griffiths

Synopsis
The mild-mannered clerk Mr. Finchley is just about to propose marriage, when he is sent by his firm to Paris where he enjoys a further series of adventures, returning a week later with an orphan boy. He completes his proposal and they adopt the boy.

References

Bibliography
 Ehland, Christoph and Wächter, Cornelia. Middlebrow and Gender, 1890-1945. BRILL, 2016.
 Reilly, John M. Twentieth Century Crime & Mystery Writers. Springer, 2015.

External links 
 Full bibliography
 The Victor Canning Pages

1938 British novels
British comedy novels
Novels set in Paris
Novels by Victor Canning
Hodder & Stoughton books